Parchment is a thin material most often used as pages of a book or manuscript.

Parchment may also refer to:

People 
 Brenton Parchment (born 1982), Jamaican cricketer
 Hansle Parchment (born 1990), Jamaican athlete
 Rebecca Parchment (born 1982), Caymanian beauty pageant winner

Other uses 
 Parchment paper (baking)
 Parchment, Michigan, a small city in the United States
 Parchment Creek, West Virginia, United States
 Parchment Housing Group, now part of The Guinness Partnership, a British charity providing affordable housing
 Parchment, Inc., a digital credential service; see Matthew Pittinsky, CEO